Ryder Windham is an American science fiction author who has written more than 60 Star Wars books, including novels, comics, and reference books. He has also written junior novelizations for Indiana Jones films. Since 1993, he has been working on Star Wars projects either by himself or with other authors. His reference book Star Wars: The Ultimate Visual Guide spent three weeks on the New York Times Best Seller list in 2005.

Career

Star Wars 
Windham started working on Star Wars projects in 1993, when he was working at Dark Horse Comics. In addition to writing, he supervised the editing process of other writers' comics, such as the Dark Horse series Heir to the Empire, Jabba the Hutt, River of Chaos, Splinter of the Mind's Eye, Starroids and Dark Empire II. In addition, he worked closely with Allan Kausch and Sue Rostoni at Lucas Licensing to maintain consistency in Star Wars comics and novels.

Maintaining Consistency in Stories 

Windham has worked closely with Leland Chee, who is in charge of monitoring the continuity in Star Wars stories, to maintain consistency throughout his published works in the Star Wars series.

Recent Years 
Since 2004, Windham has been working at Rhode Island School of Design Continuing Education as an instructor and a certificate advisor for comic and sequential art classes. Currently, he lives in Providence, Rhode Island with his wife and two daughters. Ryder Windham also works closely with the publisher becker&mayer! and Lucasfilm's publishing licensees, including Dark Horse Comics, Del Rey, DK Publishing, Grosset & Dunlap, HarperCollins, Random House, and Scholastic Inc. His work with the latter of these has included production of the Bionicle reboot novels and graphic novels.

Publications

Novels 
Star Wars The Clone Wars Secret Missions 1: Breakout Squad (2009)
Star Wars The Clone Wars Secret Missions 2: Curse of the Black Hole Pirates (2010)
Star Wars The Clone Wars Secret Missions 3: Duel at Shattered Rock (2011)
Star Wars The Clone Wars Secret Missions 4: Guardians of the Chiss Key (2012)
Star Wars Adventures in HyperSpace : Fire Ring Race (2010)
Star Wars Adventures in HyperSpace : Shinbone ShowDown (2010)
Star Wars Adventures 1: Hunt the Sun Runner (2002)
Star Wars Adventures 2: The Cavern of Screaming Skulls (2002)
Star Wars Adventures 3: The Hostage Princess (2002)
Star Wars Adventures 4: Jango Fett vs. the Razor Eaters (2003)
Star Wars Adventures 5: The Shape-Shifter Strikes (2003)
Star Wars Adventures 6: The Warlords of Balmorra (2003)
Star Wars Missions 1: Assault on Yavin Four (1997)
Star Wars Missions 2: Escape from Thyferra (1997)
Star Wars Missions 3: Attack on Delrakkin (1997)
Star Wars Missions 4: Destroy the Liquidator (1997)
Star Wars Missions 9: Revolt of the Battle Droids (1998)
Star Wars Missions 10: Showdown in Mos Eisley (1998)
Star Wars Missions 11: Bounty Hunters vs. Battle Droids (1998)
Star Wars Missions 12: The Vactooine Disaster (1998)
Star Wars Missions 17: Darth Vader's Return (1999)
Star Wars Missions 18: Rogue Squadron to the Rescue (1999)
Star Wars Missions 19: Bounty on Bonadan (1999)
Star Wars Missions 20: Total Destruction (1999)
Episode I Adventures 1: Search for the Lost Jedi (1999)
Episode I Adventures 2: The Bartokk Assassins (1999)
Episode I Adventures 3: The Fury of Darth Maul (1999)
Episode I Adventures 4: Jedi Emergency (1999)
Episode I Adventures 9: Rescue in the Core (2000)
Episode I Adventures 10: Festival of Warriors (2000)
Episode I Adventures 11: Pirates from Beyond the Sea (2000)
Episode I Adventures 12: The Bongo Rally (2000)
Star Wars Episode IV: A New Hope junior novelization (2004)
Star Wars Episode V: The Empire Strikes Back junior novelization (2004)
Star Wars Episode VI: Return of the Jedi junior novelization (2004)
Star Wars Lives & Adventures 1: The Rise and Fall of Darth Vader (2007)
Star Wars Lives & Adventures 2: The Life and Legend of Obi-Wan Kenobi (2008)
Star Wars Lives & Adventures 3: A New Hope: The Life of Luke Skywalker (2009)
Star Wars Lives & Adventures 4: The Wrath of Darth Maul (2012)
Raiders Of The Lost Ark Novelization
Last Crusade Novelization
Pyramid of the Sorcerer (2009)

Comics 
Star Wars Droids: Artoo's Day Out in Star Wars Galaxy issue#1 (1994)
Star Wars: The Mixed-Up Droid (1995)
Star Wars Droids: The Kalarba Adventures (1995)
X-wing Rogue Squadron: Apple Jacks Special Bonus Story (1995)
Shadows of the Empire Galoob Micro-Machines Mini-Comic (1996)
This Crumb for Hire in A Decade of Dark Horse issue#2 (1996)
Star Wars Droids: Rebellion
The Rebel Thief in Star Wars Kids issue#1-5 (1997)
Shadow Stalker (1997)
Star Wars Droids: The Protocol Offensive (1997)
Episode I: Qui-Gon Jinn (1999)
Episode I: The Phantom Menace ½ (1999)
Qui-Gon and Obi-Wan: Last Stand on Ord Mantell (2000)
The Death of Captain Tarpals in Star Wars Tales issue#3 (2000)
Thank the Maker! in Star Wars Tales issue#6 (2000)
Podracing Tales (2000)
Jedi Quest (2001)
Battle of the Bounty Hunters (1998)
The Clone Wars: Strange Allies (2011)

Young Readers Books 
Galactic Crisis! (2005)
Journey Through Space (2005)
Fire Ring Race (2010)
Shinbone Showdown (2010)

Reference Books 
Star Wars Who's Who (1998)
Star Wars Episode I Who's Who: A Pocket Guide to Characters of the Phantom Menace (1999)
Star Wars Episode I: The Phantom Menace Movie Scrapbook (1999)
Aurra Sing: Dawn of the Bounty Hunters with Josh Ling (2000)
Star Wars Episode II: Attack of the Clones Movie Scrapbook (2002)
Star Wars Episode III: Revenge of the Sith Movie Scrapbook (2005)
Star Wars: The Ultimate Visual Guide (2005)
Star Wars: The Comics Companion (2006)
Jedi vs. Sith: The Essential Guide to the Force (2007)
Star Wars: The Complete Vader with Peter Vilmur (2009)
Star Wars Blueprints: The Ultimate Collection (2008)
Star Wars Blueprints: Rebel Edition (2010)
Star Wars Year by Year: A Visual Chronicle (2010)
Millennium Falcon: A 3-D Owner's Guide (2010)
Imperial Death Star: Owner's Workshop Manual (2013)

Short stories
Deep Spoilers (2000)

Awards and honors

New York Times Best Seller: Star Wars: The Ultimate Visual Guide 

Week 1(November 13 to November 19, 2005): ranked 10
Week 2(December 11 to December 17, 2005): ranked 7
Week 3(December 18 to December 24, 2005): ranked 8

References 

Living people
American fantasy writers
American male novelists
21st-century American novelists
21st-century American male writers
Year of birth missing (living people)